Crinipellis is a genus of fungus in the family Marasmiaceae. The genus has a widespread distribution and contains about 65 species. It was circumscribed by French mycologist Narcisse Théophile Patouillard in 1889.

Species

Crinipellis actinophora
Crinipellis albipes
Crinipellis albocapitata
Crinipellis alcalivirens
Crinipellis atrovinosa
Crinipellis australis
Crinipellis austrorubida
Crinipellis beninensis
Crinipellis bisulcata
Crinipellis brasiliensis
Crinipellis brunneipurpurea
Crinipellis brunneoaurantiaca
Crinipellis brunnescens
Crinipellis calderi
Crinipellis calosporus
Crinipellis campanella
Crinipellis carecomoeis
Crinipellis catamarcensis
Crinipellis cervinoalba
Crinipellis chrysochaetes
Crinipellis commixta
Crinipellis coroicae
Crinipellis corticalis
Crinipellis corvina
Crinipellis cremoricolor
Crinipellis cupreostipes
Crinipellis dicotyledonum
Crinipellis dipterocarpi
Crinipellis dusenii
Crinipellis eggersii
Crinipellis excentrica
Crinipellis filiformis
Crinipellis foliicola
Crinipellis furcata
Crinipellis galeropsidoides
Crinipellis ghanaensis
Crinipellis glaucospora
Crinipellis goossensiae
Crinipellis gracilis
Crinipellis hepatica
Crinipellis herrerae
Crinipellis hirticeps
Crinipellis hygrocyboides
Crinipellis insignis
Crinipellis iopus
Crinipellis kisanganensis
Crinipellis macrosphaerigera
Crinipellis malesiana
Crinipellis mauretanica
Crinipellis maxima
Crinipellis megalospora
Crinipellis metuloidophora
Crinipellis mexicana
Crinipellis mezzanensis –Italy
Crinipellis micropilus
Crinipellis minutula
Crinipellis minutuloides
Crinipellis mirabilis
Crinipellis missionensis
Crinipellis molfinoana
Crinipellis multicolor
Crinipellis nigricaulis
Crinipellis nsimalensis
Crinipellis ochracea
Crinipellis ochraceopapillata
Crinipellis omotricha
Crinipellis pallidibrunnea
Crinipellis palmarum
Crinipellis patouillardii
Crinipellis pedemontana
Crinipellis perpusilla
Crinipellis phyllophila
Crinipellis piceae
Crinipellis podocarpi
Crinipellis procera
Crinipellis pseudopalmarum
Crinipellis pseudosplachnoides
Crinipellis pseudostipitaria
Crinipellis purpurea
Crinipellis rhizomaticola
Crinipellis rhizomorphica
Crinipellis roseola
Crinipellis roseorubella
Crinipellis rubella
Crinipellis rubida
Crinipellis rubiginosa
Crinipellis rustica
Crinipellis sapindacearum
Crinipellis sardoa
Crinipellis sarmentosa
Crinipellis scabella
Crinipellis schevczenkoi
Crinipellis schini
Crinipellis septotricha
Crinipellis sinensis
Crinipellis siparunae
Crinipellis squamosa
Crinipellis stupparia
Crinipellis substipitaria
Crinipellis subtomentosa
Crinipellis tabtim
Crinipellis tenuipilosa
Crinipellis ticoi
Crinipellis tomentosa
Crinipellis trichialis
Crinipellis trinitatis
Crinipellis tucumanensis
Crinipellis urbica
Crinipellis velutipes

See also

List of Marasmiaceae genera

References

Marasmiaceae
Agaricales genera
Taxa named by Narcisse Théophile Patouillard
Taxa described in 1889